The following highways are numbered 797:

United States